Moustafa Shakosh (born November 13, 1986 in Amuda) is a Syrian footballer. He currently plays for Teshrin SC.

International career
Shakosh plays between 2003-2005 for the Under-19 Syrian national team. The Syrian U-19 team that finished in Fourth place in the AFC U-19 Championship 2004 in Malaysia and he was a part of the Syrian U-20 team in the FIFA U-20 World Cup 2005. in the Netherlands.
He plays against Colombia in the group-stage of the FIFA U-20 World Cup 2005.

He has been a regular for the Syria national football team since 2009. Senior national coach Fajr Ibrahim called him for the first time, and he debuted in a 5 June 2009 friendly against Sierra Leone. He came on as a substitute for Mosab Balhous.

Appearances for Syrian national team
Results list Syria's goal tally first.

W = Matches won; D = Matches drawn; L = Matches lost

1 Non FIFA 'A' international match

Honour and Titles

National Team
Nehru Cup: 2009 Runner-up

References

External links
 Career stats at Kooora.com (Arabic)
 Career stats at goalzz.com

1986 births
Living people
People from Latakia
Syrian footballers
Association football goalkeepers
Syria international footballers
Syrian Premier League players